Margazhi Thingal is the first paasuram (song) of Thiruppavai. It was written by Andal as part of a vow observed throughout the month of Margazhi.

Content

Original text

Original text in English

Literal translation 
Oh beautifully ornamented girls (NEr izhaiyeer)! Prosperous (chelva) young girls (chirumeer) of the rich city (seer malgum) of Tiruvoypadi (aaypaadi-Gokulam)! This is the month (thingaL) of December/January (margazhi), an auspicious day (nan naaL) filled (niraindha) with moonlight (madhi). Those of us who want to go (pOdhuveer) take a bath in the holy river (neeraada), let us go (pOdhumeenO). The Lord (naaraayaNan), who was the son (kumaran) of NandagOpan, who could give a lot of trouble (kodun thozhilan) to enemies using his sharp spear (koor vEl); who was the little lion (iLam singam) of the beautiful (Eraarndha) eyed (kaNNi) YasOda; who is dark (kaar) skinned (mEni); who has perfect (sen) eyes (kaN); and who has a face (mugaththaan) like (pOl) the radiance (kadhir) of the moon (madhiyam); will give (tharuvaan) us (namakkE) his blessings (paRai). Hey (El)! Let us immerse in water (padindhu) and do the penance of 'paavai nOnbu' (Or embaavaai), a practice praised (pugazha) by the people of the world (paarOr).

Translation 
Now is the month of Maargazhi. It is the auspicious full moon day. Lovely young ornamented maidens of Gokulam (the cowherd colony), which is flourishing in wealth! Don't you want to bathe in the Yamunaa? Please come take part in the festival! (Paavai Nombu). Naarayana, the son of Nandagopa, with his sharp spear, is a terror to his enemies, Naarayana, the young lion cub of Yasoda, who has charming eyes, Lord Naaraayana with his dark-cloud like complexion and eyes of crimson lotus hue, with his lustrous face shining like the sun and cool like the full moon will surely grant us all our wishes! Come, let us bathe and celebrate the festival, for which the world will praise us.

References

External links

 

Tamil-language literature